Pool A of the 2015 Fed Cup Americas Group I was one of two pools in the Americas Group I of the 2015 Fed Cup. Three teams competed in a round robin competition, with the top team and the bottom two teams proceeding to their respective sections of the play-offs: the top team played for advancement to the World Group II Play-offs, while the bottom team faced potential relegation to Group II.

Standings

Round-robin

Colombia vs. Chile

Brazil vs. Chile

Brazil vs. Colombia

References

External links 
 Fed Cup website

2015 Fed Cup Americas Zone